"In My Craft or Sullen Art" is a poem written by Welsh poet Dylan Thomas (1914–1953).

First published in 1946 in Deaths and Entrances, the poem describes a poet who must write for the sake of his craft rather than any material gains that may come from his work.

Text 
In my craft or sullen art
Exercised in the still night
When only the moon rages
And the lovers lie abed
With all their griefs in their arms,
I labour by singing light
Not for ambition or bread
Or the strut and trade of charms
On the ivory stages
But for the common wages
Of their most secret heart.

Not for the proud man apart
From the raging moon I write
On these spindrift pages
Nor for the towering dead
With their nightingales and psalms
But for the lovers, their arms
Round the griefs of the ages,
Who pay no praise or wages
Nor heed my craft or art.

Use as lyrics
The poem has been set to music on at least two occasions. It was scored for mezzo-soprano and piano in 2001 by Wayne L. Davies as part of a Dylan Thomas song-cycle. It was also provided the basis - and lyrics - for "In my craft or sullen art", a song by New Zealand pop group Mink in 1995. A further musical version - part of an album of songs inspired by Thomas - was released by New Zealand's Chris Matthews and Robot Monkey Orchestra in 2008. In 2008 it was set to music by composer Thomas Hewitt Jones as a tone-poem for Soprano, Piano and Cello, first performed at the Royal Opera House in January 2009. It also appeared on Perth County Conspiracy album Does Not Exist. It was also set as a two-part choir anthem in 1996, by Mark Holmes, and performed by the students of St. Andrew's School, Turi.

Other uses
In 2009, the London-based Poetry Society used the text of this poem for their "Knit A Poem" project.  Each letter of the poem was charted and knit onto a square by volunteers. Spaces and "white space" used knitted blocks without a letter to fill in around the text, also knit by volunteers. More than 850 volunteers from all over the world participated. The finished poem was 7mx9m and was unveiled on October 7, 2009 in front of the British Library in London. The poem is cited at the start of the 1971 film The Raging Moon by Bryan Forbes starring Malcolm McDowell and Nanette Newman.

References

External links
YouTube video of Dylan Thomas reading "In my Craft or Sullen Art"
Official Dylan Thomas website
Official Poetry Society website

Poetry by Dylan Thomas
Modernist poems